Magda Frank Fischer (20 July 1914 – 23 June 2010) was a Hungarian-Argentine sculptor.

Biography 
She was born in Kolozsvár, Transylvania, which at that time belonged to Hungary but in 1918, was incorporated into Romania. Because of Nazi persecution, she left Hungary to settle in Switzerland. Years later, she moved to Paris to study at the Académie Julian. In 1950, she arrived in Buenos Aires, Argentina to visit her brother, her only living family member. Here, she was appointed professor at the Artes Visuales de Buenos Aires and exhibited at the Galería Pizarro.  She participated in the Premio Palanza Buenos Aires. She received the Benito Quinquela Martín award at the Eduardo Sívori Museum, and was honored by the Argentine Senate. Her works are part of the collections at the Musée National d'Art Moderne in Paris, the National Museum of Fine Arts in Paris, the National Museum of Fine Arts in Buenos Aires. Frank resettled in Argentina in 1995 and built the Magda Frank House Museum in the Saavedra barrio at Vedia 3546. She died in 2010 in Buenos Aires.

References

1914 births
2010 deaths
20th-century Hungarian sculptors
21st-century Hungarian sculptors
20th-century Hungarian women artists
21st-century Hungarian women artists
Artists from Cluj-Napoca
Hungarian emigrants to Argentina
Naturalized citizens of Argentina
Hungarian Jews
Hungarian women sculptors
Hungarian expatriates in Argentina
Argentine people of Hungarian-Jewish descent
Jewish women sculptors
Argentine women sculptors